Bridges is a hamlet in mid Cornwall, England, UK, close to Luxulyan on the edge of the St Austell china clay district.

References

Hamlets in Cornwall